John Barr (28 July 1887–25 December 1971) was a New Zealand librarian. He was born in Glasgow, Lanarkshire, Scotland on 28 July 1887.

References

1887 births
1971 deaths
New Zealand librarians
Scottish emigrants to New Zealand